Ogcocephalus cubifrons, the spotted batfish, is a species of fish in the anglerfish genus in the batfish family Ogcocephalidae.

The fish is found in the Western Central Atlantic Ocean, from North Carolina and the Bahamas and northwest Florida to the Campeche Bank off of the Yucatan.

References

Ogcocephalidae
Taxa named by John Richardson (naturalist)
Fish described in 1836
Fish of the Atlantic Ocean